"Takeda Lullaby" ( or Takeda no komoriuta) is a popular Japanese cradle song. It originated in Takeda, Fushimi, Kyoto.

Background
The song has long been sung by the people in the burakumin areas of Kyoto and Osaka in a slightly different form. During the 1960s, it was picked up as a theme song by the Buraku Liberation League, particularly its branch at Takeda.

Burakumin ("hamlet people") were an outcast community at the bottom of the Japanese social order that had historically been the victims of severe discrimination and ostracism. These communities were often made up of those with occupations considered impure or tainted by death (e.g., executioners, undertakers, workers in slaughterhouses, butchers, or tanners). Professions such as these had severe social stigmas of kegare, or "defilement", attached to them. A burakumin neighborhood within metropolitan Tokyo was the last to be served by streetcar and is the site of butcher and leather shops to this day.

In this lullaby, a young girl comforts herself by singing about her miserable situation. One day, she is forcibly sent away to work for a rich family at a village across the mountain. Every day as she works with a baby on her back, she is reminded of her family, looking at the silhouette of the mountains in the direction of her homeland.

Recordings

In 1969, the folk singing group  made this song popular, and their single, recorded in 1971, became a bestseller. The song has also an additional history in that NHK and other major Japanese broadcasting networks refrained from playing it because it is related to burakumin activities, but this ban was stopped during the 1990s.

The song has been translated into Chinese by the Taiwanese lyricist Weng Bingrong with the name "qidao". The meaning of the lyrics has been changed to being about taking care of everyone instead of the complaints of a babysitter of the Takeda hamlet in the original version. It also became famous in China and Taiwan since it was performed by Dave Wang (Wang Jie) and Wang Yunchan in 1993 as well as in recordings by Li Pi-hua (李碧華) and Liu Wen-cheng (劉文正). In this rendition, it was presented as a Japanese classic.

In 2001, singer Eri Sugai included a version of the song on her album Mai.

In 2017, the folk supergroup Bendith included a Welsh language version on their Bendith EP.

Lyrics

Japanese

Romanized Japanese

English translation

See also
 Other Japanese lullabies: Itsuki Lullaby, Edo Lullaby, Chugoku Region Lullaby, Shimabara Lullaby, etc.

References

External links
 Takeda Lullaby (in Japanese)
 Takeda Lullaby (Lyrics with Japanese translation)
 Takeda Lullaby (Music score)
 Takeda Lullaby (MIDI music)
 Lullaby of Takeda  (Played on the ocarina, YouTube)

Lullabies
Japanese folk songs
Kyoto
Year of song unknown
Songwriter unknown